High and Low may refer to:

Film and TV
 High and Low (1933 film), a French drama
 High and Low (1963 film), a Japanese film directed by Akira Kurosawa
 "High and Low" (CSI), an episode of the TV series CSI: Crime Scene Investigation
High&Low, a Japanese action media franchise
 High&Low The Movie, a 2016 Japanese film

Art and books
 High and Low, a 1966 collection of poems by John Betjeman
 Hi-And-Low, a 1996 manga by Kouta Hirano

Music
 "High and Low", a 2006 song by Greg Laswell
 "High and Low" (Empire of the Sun song), 2016
 "High and Low" (Tove Styrke song), 2011
 "Hi & Low", a song by boyband The Wanted on their 2010 album The Wanted
 High & Low Down, a 1971 album by Louisiana blues musician Lightnin' Slim

See also
 High-low pricing, a form of retail pricing
 High Low (disambiguation)
 Hi-Lo (disambiguation)